Zadadra costalis is a moth of the subfamily Arctiinae. It is found in northern China and Assam, India.

References

Moths described in 1878
Lithosiina